Boron phosphate is an inorganic compound with the chemical formula BPO4. The simplest way of producing it is the reaction of phosphoric acid and boric acid. It is a white infusible solid that evaporates above 1450 °C.

Synthesis
Boron phosphate is synthesized from phosphoric acid and boric acid at a temperature range from 80 °C to 1200 °C. The relatively cold treatment produces a white amorphous powder, which is converted to a microcrystalline product when heated at about 1000 °C for 2 hours.

The main reaction of the process is:

H3BO3 + H3PO4 → BPO4 + 3 H2O

New ways of synthesizing the compound have also been reported, such as hydrothermal and microwave synthesis.

Due to the particular industrial interest of boron phosphate, other methods are used as well:
Phosphoric acid and triethyl borate
Triethyl phosphate and boron trichloride
Diammonium phosphate acid and borax heated to 1000 °C
Boric acid and phosphorus pentoxide (hydrothermal)

Structure
If obtained at pressure, the ordinary structure is isomorphous with the β-cristobalite, while subjecting it to high pressure is obtained a compound isomorphic with α-quartz. The structure of AlPO4, berlinite, is isomorphous with α-quartz.

Applications
It is used as a catalyst for dehydration and other reactions in organic synthesis. Also, it serves as a source of phosphates for exchange reactions in the solid state to obtain metal phosphates.

References

Boron compounds
Phosphates